Sinozolus is a genus of ground beetles in the family Carabidae. There are six described species in Sinozolus, all from China.

Species
These six species belong to the genus Sinozolus:
 Sinozolus lopatini Belousov & Kabak, 2005
 Sinozolus micrangulus Belousov & Kabak, 2005
 Sinozolus morvani Deuve, 2007
 Sinozolus ovalis Belousov & Kabak, 2005
 Sinozolus setosus Belousov & Kabak, 2005
 Sinozolus yuae Deuve, 1997

References

Trechinae